Jean-Baptiste Maçon was a merchant and political figure in Upper Canada. He represented Essex in the Legislative Assembly of Upper Canada from 1830 to 1834 as a Conservative.

He received a land grant in Amherstburgh. Maçon was a captain in the Essex militia and a justice of the peace for the Western District. He was of the Roman Catholic faith.

References 

Year of birth missing
Year of death missing
Members of the Legislative Assembly of Upper Canada
Canadian justices of the peace